Zhihe is a town under the administration of Yonghe County, Shanxi, China.

Administrative divisions 
, it administers four residential neighborhoods and 12 villages:
Kangxie Community
Lianhua Community
Chaoyang Community
Binhe Community
Chengguan Village
Yaojiawan Village
Dongyugou Village
Guanzhuang Village
Dujiazhuang Village
Yulinze Village
Liujiazhuang Village
Huojiagou Village
Xiabagu Village
Honghuagou Village
Qianganluhe Village
Changle Village

References 

Township-level divisions of Shanxi
Yonghe County